Carlos Martín Domínguez (born 22 April 2002) is a Spanish professional footballer who plays as a forward for Atlético Madrid B.

Career
Martín joined the youth academy of Atlético Madrid in 2008, and started training with their first team in the summer of 2021. He made his senior debut with Atletico in a 1–0 La Liga win over Osasuna on 20 November 2021, coming on as a sub in the 85th minute.

References

External links
 
 

2002 births
Living people
Spanish footballers
Footballers from Madrid
Association football forwards
La Liga players
Primera Federación players
Atlético Madrid footballers
Atlético Madrid B players